This is a list of house organs.

A house organ (also variously known as an in-house magazine, in-house publication, house journal, shop paper, plant paper, or employee magazine) is a magazine or periodical published by a company for its customers or its employees. 

American Rifleman
Ariel
Bell Labs Record
Bell System Technical Journal
Disney Magazine
Dragon
Dungeon
The General
Nintendo Power
Operations
Presenza
The Signpost
TWX

Inflight magazines
An inflight magazine (or in-flight magazine) is a free magazine distributed via the seats of an airplane by an airline company.

Above&Beyond
American Way
Caribbean Beat
Celebrated Living
Cielos Argentinos
Continental
EnRoute
Hana Hou!
Hemispheres
Jetstar Magazine
Scanorama
SkyMall
Yukon, North of Ordinary

House organs